Borja Gómez Rus (born 10 February 2005) is a Spanish motorcycle racer, currently competing in the Moto2 World Championship for Fantic Motor.

Career
Gómez began competing at the national level in 2014, finishing third place in the Spanish Minimotard 65 Championship. In 2015, he climbed a step and reached second place. After going through Supermotard he reached the Kawasaki Cup in 2019, achieving a creditable third place. In 2021, he won the Spanish Superbike Championship in the Supersport category. In 2022, he became runner-up in the Spanish Superbike 1,000 Championship with the Cardoso Team driving a Yamaha, after Tito Rabat.

On 23 October 2022, at the age of 17, Gómez made his debut in the Moto2 World Championship with the Flexbox HP40, replacing Jorge Navarro at the Sepang Circuit in Malaysia. At the 2022 Valencian Community motorcycle Grand Prix in Cheste, he finished in 12th place, earning him his first four points in the world championship. For the 2023 season Gómez signed with Fantic Motor.

Career statistics

Grand Prix motorcycle racing

By season

By class

Races by year
(key) (Races in bold indicate pole position; races in italics indicate fastest lap)

References

2005 births
Living people
People from Comarca of Mar Menor
Sportspeople from the Region of Murcia
Spanish motorcycle racers
Moto2 World Championship riders
21st-century Spanish people